Meda Nunatak (‘Nunatak Meda’ \'nu-na-tak 'me-da\) is the rocky ridge extending 2.65 km in west-northwest to east-southeast direction, 700 m wide and rising to 1128 m in Attlee Glacier on Foyn Coast, Antarctic Peninsula.

The feature is named after Meda of Odessos (4th century BC), a Thracian princess and wife of Philip II of Macedon.

Location
British mapping in 1974.

Maps
 British Antarctic Territory: Graham Land.  Scale 1:250000 topographic map.  BAS 250 Series, Sheet SQ 19-20.  London, 1974.
 Antarctic Digital Database (ADD). Scale 1:250000 topographic map of Antarctica. Scientific Committee on Antarctic Research (SCAR). Since 1993, regularly upgraded and updated.

Notes

References
 Meda Nunatak. SCAR Composite Antarctic Gazetteer.
 Bulgarian Antarctic Gazetteer. Antarctic Place-names Commission. (details in Bulgarian, basic data in English)

External links
 Meda Nunatak. Copernix satellite image

Nunataks of Graham Land
Foyn Coast
Bulgaria and the Antarctic